Peter Roehr (born 1 September 1944 in Lauenburg in Pommern; died 15 August 1968 in Frankfurt am Main) was a German Pop Art minimalist artist.

Life 
Roehr was the only child of Kurt and Eleonora Röhr. After their divorce the mother moved with her child first to Leipzig and then to Frankfurt am Main. After visiting the Volksschule he completed an apprenticeship as producer for electronic signage in Frankfurt am Main. Afterward he studied from 1962 to 1966 at the Werkkunstschule (today RheinMain University of Applied Sciences) in Wiesbaden. He studied in the class of Vincent Weber and graduated in 1966. His early works were made in 1962 and 1963. In 1964 Roehr met Paul Maenz, who later became an import art dealer. Roehr was in close contact with the artists Charlotte Posenenske and Thomas Bayrle, who lived in Frankfurt as well.

In May 1967 Roehr and Paul Maenz organized in the Studio Galerie of the Goethe University Frankfurt a groundbreaking exhibition entitled Serielle Formationen where works by Carl Andre, Jan Dibbets, Hans Haacke, Donald Judd, Piero Manzoni and Jan Schoonhoven were shown.

Peter Roehr died in 1968 at the age of 23 from cancer.

Work 
During a period of five years Roehr produced more than 600 works. They can be categorized in ten groups. Each group is defined by the material the regarded work is made of. Roehrs Oeuvre can be labelled as conceptual art because he aligned each work to the conception of the unvaried repetition.

Montages 
His most famous work, Film-Montages I-III (1965), was edited on 16mm film (and would later be digitized) from fragments of TV commercials to create an aesthetic film and illustrating his concept of a time structure related to principles of serial music. He would do the same thing with radio adverts on his 1966 piece Tonmontagen (Sound Montages).

Legacy 
Video artist William E. Jones paid tribute with his 2006 piece Film Montages (for Peter Roehr) featuring non-explicit fragments from pre-AIDS gay porn films.

Quotations 
"I alter material by organizing it unchanged. Each work is an organized area of identical elements. Neither successive nor additive, there is no result or sum." (1964)

"I assemble available things of the same kind together. These might, for example, be: objects, photographs, freestanding forms such as letters, texts, tones and sounds, film-material, etc. The results I call montages" (1965)

Exhibitions (selection) 
1965: Adam Seide, Frankfurt am Main, Abendausstellung II (auch 1967)
1967: Galerie Dorothea Loehr, Frankfurt am Main
1971: Morsbroich Museum, Leverkusen
1971: Galerie Paul Maenz, Cologne (also in 1972, 1973, 1974, 1976, 1981, 1985, 1988)
1972: Galleria Sperone, Turin; documenta 5, Kassel
1977: Kunsthalle Tübingen; documenta 6, Kassel
1977: Van Abbemuseum, Eindhoven; Frankfurter Kunstverein, Frankfurt am Main; Kunsthalle Tübingen
1978: Museum of Modern Art, Oxford
2000: Neues Museum Weimar, Weimar
2004: Museum für Moderne Kunst, Frankfurt am Main
2009: Städel Museum and Museum für Moderne Kunst, Frankfurt am Main: Peter Roehr. Werke aus Frankfurter Sammlungen
 2010: Haus Konstruktiv, Zürich: Visionäre Sammlung Vol.12: Peter Roehr
2012: Kunsthaus Wiesbaden: dasselbe anders / immer dasselbe: Charlotte Posenenske und Peter Roehr

See also 
Andy Warhol
Vaporwave - similar in content
Criticism of capitalism
Minimalist film
Roy Lichtenstein

References

External links
Light Industry: We Dig Repition - Peter Roehr on Experimental Cinema
The Cold and Crystalline Poetry of Minimal Pop Artist Peter Roehr
Teaser trailer for German Pop Exhibition (with material from Peter Roehr) on Vimeo

German artists
1944 births
1968 deaths
People from Lębork
Collage filmmakers
Collage artists
Pop artists
Deaths from cancer
Minimalist artists